{{Infobox boxing match
| fight date    = April 13, 2013
| Fight Name    = Nonito Donaire vs. Guillermo Rigondeaux
| image         = 
| location      =  Radio City Music Hall, New York, New York, U.S.
| fighter1      =  Nonito Donaire
| nickname1     = The Filipino Flash
| record1       = 31–1 (20 KO)
| hometown1     = Talibon, Bohol, Philippines
| height1       = 5 ft 5+1/2 in
| weight1       = 121+1/2 lb
| style1        = Orthodox
| recognition1  = WBO and The Ring super bantamweight champion[[The Ring (magazine)|The Ring]] No. 5 ranked pound-for-pound fighter3-division world champion
| fighter2      =  Guillermo Rigondeaux
| nickname2     = El Chacal 
| record2       = 11–0 (8 KO)
| hometown2     = Santiago de Cuba, Cuba
| height2       = 5 ft 4+1/2 in
| weight2       = 121+1/2 lb
| style2        = Southpaw
| recognition2  = WBA (Super) super bantamweight champion
| titles        = WBA (Super), WBO, and The Ring super  bantamweight titles
| result        =  Rigondeaux wins via 12-round unanimous decision (114-113, 115-112, 116-111)
}}

Nonito Donaire vs. Guillermo Rigondeaux was a super bantamweight professional boxing match contested between WBO and The Ring champion Nonito Donaire and WBA (Super) champion Guillermo Rigondeaux. The bout took place at Radio City Music Hall in New York City on April 13, 2013 and was televised on HBO. Entering the bout, Donaire had a record of 31–1 and had made three successful defenses of the WBO title he had won by defeating Wilfredo Vazquez, Jr. Rigondeaux, meanwhile, was undefeated in his eleven fights and was fighting for the fourth time as champion; he won the WBA interim title by defeating Ricardo Cordoba in November 2010 and defeated Rico Ramos to become official champion in January 2012.

Rigondeaux defeated Donaire by unanimous decision to remain undefeated. Donaire had not lost since his second professional fight.

Background

 Donaire 
Donaire entered the fight on a 30-bout winning streak and had recently knocked out Jorge Arce to retain both the WBO (His third defense of the title) and The Ring'' Super Bantamweight championships.

Rigondeaux 
Rigondeaux entered the fight undefeated in his professional career on an 11-bout winning streak. He had recently defeated Roberto Marroquin to retain the WBA Super World Super Bantamweight championship, his second defense of the title. Out of all his 11 victories, he had won 8 of them by knockout.

Undercard

Televised
Super Bantamweight Unified Championship bout:  Nonito Donaire (c)   vs.  Guillermo Rigondeaux (c)
Rigondeaux defeated Donaire via Unanimous Decision (116-111, 115-112, 114-113).

Preliminary card

Welterweight bout:  Mikaël Zewski vs.  Daniel Sostre
Zewski defeated Sostre via KO at 0:49 of the second round.

Light Heavyweight bout:  Sean Monaghan vs.  Dion Stanley
Monaghan defeated Stanley via TKO at 1:51 of the first round.

Super Welterweight bout:  Glen Tapia vs.  Joseph De los Santos
Tapia defeated los Santos via Unanimous Decision (80-72. 80-72, 80-72).

Super Middleweight bout:  Jesse Hart vs.  Marlon Farr
Hart defeated Farr via TKO at 1:33 of the third round.

Super Featherweight bout:  Félix Verdejo vs.  Steve Gutierrez
Verdejo defeated Gutierrez via TKO at 1:51 of the first round.

Super Featherweight bout:  Toka Kahn Clary vs.  Gadiel Andaluz
Clary defeated Andaluz via TKO at 1:32 of the first round.

Welterweight bout:  Dario Socci vs.  Tyler Canning	
Canning defeated Socci via Split Decision (39-37, 37-39, 39-37).

Super Featherweight bout:  Erick De Leon vs.  Diamond Baier
De Leon defeated Baier via Unanimous Decision (40-36, 40-34, 40-36).

Reported fight earnings
Nonito Donaire $1,320,000 vs. Guillermo Rigondeaux $750,000

International Broadcasting

Notes

See also

2013 in boxing
2013 in sports in New York City
2010s in Manhattan
April 2013 sports events in the United States
Boxing matches in New York City
Boxing matches
Boxing on HBO
Radio City Music Hall
Sports competitions in New York City
Sports in Manhattan